In Another World is the ninth studio album by American country music artist Joe Diffie. It was released on October 30, 2001, through Monument Records. His only album for Monument, it features the single "In Another World", a Top Ten single on the Billboard country singles charts in 2002. "This Pretender" was also released as a single, reaching #48.

Two of this album's tracks were also recorded by other artists. "The Grandpa That I Know" was originally recorded by Tim Mensy on his 1992 album This Ol' Heart and later by Patty Loveless on her 2004 album On Your Way Home. "My Give a Damn's Busted" was covered by Jo Dee Messina on her 2005 album Delicious Surprise. Messina's rendition of the latter song was released in early 2005, and was a Number One single for her on the country charts.

Track listing

Personnel
 Mike Brignardello - bass guitar
 Mark Casstevens - acoustic guitar
 Joe Diffie - lead vocals, background vocals
 Dan Dugmore - Dobro, pedal steel guitar
 Paul Franklin - Dobro, Hawaiian guitar
 Aubrey Haynie - fiddle, mandolin
 David Hungate - bass guitar
 John Barlow Jarvis - keyboards, organ, piano
 B. James Lowry - acoustic guitar, electric guitar, slide guitar
 Brent Mason - acoustic guitar, electric guitar, gut string guitar
 Steve Nathan - keyboards, organ, piano
 Kim Parent - background vocals
 Zach Turner - banjo, clavinet, harp
 Tommy White - Dobro
 Lonnie Wilson - drums, percussion, acoustic guitar, background vocals
 Glenn Worf - bass guitar

Chart performance

2001 albums
Joe Diffie albums
Monument Records albums
Albums produced by Don Cook